World's End is a 1987 historical fiction novel by T. C. Boyle.  The novel, characterized by dark satire, tells the story of several generations of families in the Hudson River Valley.  It was the winner of the 1988 PEN/Faulkner Award for American Fiction.

Book information
World's End by T. C. Boyle
Hardcover –  (1987, First edition) published by Viking Press
Paperback –  (July 20, 1990) published by Penguin Books

In popular culture 
The book was referenced in the popular American sitcom How I Met Your Mother, in the season 5 episode "Girls Vs. Suits".

External links
 T.C. Boyle official website

1987 American novels
American historical novels
Novels by T. C. Boyle
American satirical novels
Novels set in New York (state)
Hudson Valley
Viking Press books
PEN/Faulkner Award for Fiction-winning works